NCOD may refer to:

 National Coming Out Day
 National Center on Deafness